Marie Louise is a French feminine compound given name.

Marie Louise may also refer to:

 Marie-Louise (conscript), a type of conscript in the last years of the Napoleonic Wars
 Marie-Louise (film), a 1944 Swiss film
 Maria Luiza Boulevard, a central boulevard in Sofia, Bulgaria
 Marie Louise Diadem, a turquoise and diamond diadem owned by the Smithsonian Institution
 Marie Louise Island, Amirante Islands, Seychelles
 Marie Louise v. Marot, a Louisiana court case on slavery
 Joseph-Guillaume Barthe (1816–1893), French writer who used the pseudonym 'Marie Louise'

People with the mononym
 Marie Louise, Queen of Poland (1611–1667)
 Marie Louise d'Aspremont (1651/1652–1692)
 Marie Louise d'Orléans (1662–1689)
 Marie Louise of Savoy (1688–1714)
 Marie Louise of Hesse-Kassel (1688–1765)
 Marie Louise de Rohan (1720–1803)
 Marie Louise de La Tour d'Auvergne (1725–1793)
 Marie Louise of France (1728–1733)
 Marie-Louise, Princesse de Lamballe (1749–1792)
 Marie Louise of Naples and Sicily (1773–1802)
 Marie Louise, Queen of Etruria (1773–1803)
 Marie-Louise of Spain (1782–1824)
 Marie Louise, Duchess of Parma (1791–1847)
 Duchess Marie Louise of Mecklenburg-Schwerin (1803–1862)
 Marie-Louise of France (1812–1850)
 Marie Louise de la Ramé (1839–1908)
 Countess Marie Larisch von Moennich (1858–1940)
 Princess Marie Louise of Bourbon-Parma  (1870–1899)
 Princess Marie Louise of Schleswig-Holstein (1872–1956}
 Princess Marie Louise of Hanover (1879–1948)
 Princess Marie Louise of Orléans (1896–1973)
 Princess Marie-Louise of Madagascar (1897–1948)
 Princess Marie Louise of Schaumburg-Lippe (1897–1938}
 Princess Marie Louise of Bulgaria (born 1933)

See also

Louise-Marie
Maria Luisa
Mary Louise (disambiguation)